Charmidea was a town of ancient Bithynia. Its name does not appear in ancient authors but is inferred from epigraphic evidence.

Its site is located near Çeltikçi in Asiatic Turkey.

References

Populated places in Bithynia
Former populated places in Turkey
History of Bursa Province